Scytodes venusta is a species of spider of the genus Scytodes. It is distributed from Sri Lanka to Java, and introduced in the Netherlands. Female is known with 4.75-5.5 mm of length.

See also
 List of Scytodidae species

References

Scytodidae
Spiders of Asia
Spiders described in 1890